This is a list of Danish television related events from 1964.

Events
15 February - Bjørn Tidmand is selected to represent Denmark at the 1964 Eurovision Song Contest with his song "Sangen om dig". He is selected to be the eighth Danish Eurovision entry during Dansk Melodi Grand Prix held at the Tivolis Koncertsal in Copenhagen.
21 March - The 9th Eurovision Song Contest is held at the Tivolis Koncertsal in Copenhagen. Italy wins the contest with the song "Non ho l'età", performed by Gigliola Cinquetti.

Debuts

Television shows

Ending this year

Births
4 January - Mek Pek, singer, actor & TV host
1 June - Marianne Florman, handball player & TV host
3 November - Paprika Steen, actress

Deaths

See also
 1964 in Denmark